Sun Jianguo (born 1952) is a retired admiral of the Chinese People's Liberation Army Navy (PLAN). He served as Deputy Chief of the Joint Staff from 2009 to 2017.

Biography
Sun Jianguo was born in 1952 in Wuqiao, Hebei. He joined the People's Liberation Army (PLA) in 1968, and graduated from the PLA Navy Submarine Academy in 1978. From 1996 to 2000 he served as deputy commander of the Navy submarine base and President of the Submarine Academy. He was appointed Deputy Chief of Staff of the PLA Navy in 2000, and promoted to Chief of Staff in 2004. In 2006 he became Assistant to the PLA Chief of Staff, and was promoted to Deputy PLA Chief of Staff in 2009.  In 2013, Sun replaced Qi Jianguo as head of the China Institute for International Strategic Studies, taking over responsibility for military intelligence and diplomacy.

He attained the rank of rear admiral in 1999, vice-admiral in July 2006, and admiral in July 2011.

Sun was an alternate member of the 17th Central Committee of the Communist Party of China and a full member of the 18th Central Committee.

References

1952 births
Living people
People's Liberation Army generals from Hebei
People from Cangzhou
Chiefs of Staff of the People's Liberation Army Navy